The Valea Mare is a left tributary of the river Timiș in Romania. It flows into the Timiș near Prisian.

References

Rivers of Romania
Rivers of Caraș-Severin County